Blue River is an unincorporated community in Polk Township, Washington County, in the U.S. state of Indiana.

History
A post office was established at Blue River in 1873, and remained in operation until it was discontinued in 1904.

Geography

References

Unincorporated communities in Washington County, Indiana
Unincorporated communities in Indiana